The Waste Makers is a 1960 book on consumerism by Vance Packard. It was bestselling when it was released. The book argues that people in the United States consume a lot more than they should and are harmed by their consumption.

Summary
One reviewer summarized the book's thesis as follows:

Another reviewer noted:
 
 

Vance Packard worked to change the meaning of the term "consumerism" from a positive word about consumer practices to a negative word meaning excessive materialism and waste. The ads for his book The Waste Makers prominently featured the word "consumerism" in a negative way.

Reviews
One reviewer said that the book is an examination of how economic growth became thought to be a virtue.

Another reviewer said that the book describes the manipulation of ordinary people by business interests. The reviewer for Commentary noted that Packard had made harsh attacks on businessmen.

References

External links
entry at Archive.org

1960 non-fiction books
Ethically disputed business practices
Marketing techniques
Non-fiction books about consumerism